Boris Prokopič  (born 29 March 1988) is a footballer who plays as a midfielder for Brühl in the Swiss third-tier Promotion League. Born in what is now Slovakia, Prokopič was a youth international for Austria.

Career
Prokopić began his career in the youth from SV Horn. In 2006, at the age of sixteen, he joined to the Academy from Rapid Wien and after one year was promoted to the reserve team. Here he played during summer 2008 then was called from Peter Pacult for the Kampfmannschaft. On 8 July 2008 the first game of the 2008–09 season he gave his debut against SK Sturm Graz.
 
In the 2009–10 season in winter he was loaned out to FC Wacker Innsbruck (2002).In first season they were playing Austrian Football First League. In the second season they were promoted to Austrian Football Bundesliga. He made 29 appearances and scored 5 goals for Innsbruck.
 
In winter 2011 he returned to Rapid Wien. He played there until January 2013. He made 29 appearances and scored 5 goals. In January 2013 he left Rapid Wien and joined SCR Altach. He played there until January 2019. He made 113 appearances and scored 13 goals.
 
In January 2019 he joined FC Vaduz. In August 2020 they were promoted to the Swiss Super League.

In June 2022, Prokopič moved to Brühl in Switzerland.

References

External links

1988 births
Living people
Austrian people of Slovak descent
Sportspeople from Poprad
Austrian footballers
Slovak footballers
Association football midfielders
Austria youth international footballers
Austrian Football Bundesliga players
2. Liga (Austria) players
Swiss Challenge League players
Swiss Promotion League players
SK Rapid Wien players
FC Wacker Innsbruck (2002) players
SC Rheindorf Altach players
FC Vaduz players
SC Brühl players
Austrian expatriate footballers
Austrian expatriate sportspeople in Liechtenstein
Expatriate footballers in Liechtenstein
Austrian expatriate sportspeople in Switzerland
Expatriate footballers in Switzerland
Czechoslovak emigrants to Austria